Monomeith was a railway station on the South Gippsland line in South Gippsland, Victoria, Australia. The station operated until the late 1970s. None of this station remains intact except for a very rusty set of points coming out of the former station, however the track still in reasonable condition.

Despite hopes of re-opening the line between Cranbourne and Leongatha of which this station is part, the Victorian State Government has decided not to reopen the line, as the costs were too high, at $72 million dollars. Improved coach services have been provided instead. Near the former Monomeith Railway Station is the local horse club. There is also the Worri Yallock Creek concrete piles trestle bridge nearby the station site, which is the second largest bridge on the South Gippsland Railway Line.

Disused railway stations in Victoria (Australia)